Yaniv Segev (born 20 June 1996) is an Israeli footballer who plays as a midfielder for Hapoel Rishon LeZion. He was born in Israel to Portuguese-Jewish dad and South African-Jewish mom.

Career

Club career

As a youth player, Segev joined the youth academy of South African side Bidvest Wits. Before the second half of 2014–15, he signed for Maccabi Petah Tikva in the Israeli top flight. In 2015, he signed for Israeli second division club Hapoel Nir Ramat HaSharon. In 2017, Segev signed for Hapoel Kfar Shalem in the Israeli third division. Before the second half of 2017–18, he signed for Israeli second division team Ironi Nesher.

Before the 2019 season, he signed for IFK Lidingö in the Swedish fourth division.  In 2020, Segev signed for Romanian second division outfit U Cluj. In 2021, he signed for Hapoel Nof HaGalil in the Israeli top flight. On 18 December 2021, he debuted for Hapoel Nof HaGalil during a 0–2 loss to Maccabi Petah Tikva.

International career

Segev is eligible to represent South Africa and Portugal internationally.

References

External links
 

1996 births
Living people
Israeli footballers
CS Aerostar Bacău players
FC Universitatea Cluj players
IFK Lidingö players
Ironi Nesher F.C. players
Maccabi Petah Tikva F.C. players
Hapoel Jerusalem F.C. players
Maccabi Yavne F.C. players
Hapoel Kfar Shalem F.C. players
Hapoel Nir Ramat HaSharon F.C. players
Hapoel Nof HaGalil F.C. players
Hapoel Rishon LeZion F.C. players
Israeli Premier League players
Liga Leumit players
Liga II players
Israeli people of South African-Jewish descent
Israeli people of Portuguese-Jewish descent
Israeli expatriate footballers
Expatriate footballers in Romania
Expatriate footballers in Sweden
Expatriate soccer players in South Africa
Israeli expatriate sportspeople in Romania
Israeli expatriate sportspeople in Sweden
Israeli expatriate sportspeople in South Africa
Association football midfielders